False Smiles is the debut album from British singer Amy Studt. Originally released in 2003 with 14 tracks, the album was re-released on 26 January 2004 with the new single, a cover of the Sheryl Crow classic "All I Wanna Do". It sold around 200,000 copies and was certified gold.

Track listing

Charts

References

2003 debut albums
Amy Studt albums